Heimar Williams is a former South African rugby union player who played first class rugby between 2011 and 2017.

He retired after the 2016 season, aged just , to pursue his career as a chartered accountant.

References

External links
 
 
 

1991 births
Living people
South African rugby union players
Sharks (Currie Cup) players
Sharks (rugby union) players
Rugby union centres
People from Krugersdorp
South African people of British descent
Rugby union players from Gauteng